Romanschulzia is a genus of flowering plants belonging to the family Brassicaceae.

Its native range is Mexico and Central America. It is found in Costa Rica, Guatemala, and Panamá.

The genus name of Romanschulzia is in honour of Roman Schulz (1873–1926), a German botanist and teacher in Berlin. 
It was first described and published in Bot. Jahrb. Syst. Vol.66 on page 99 in 1933.

Known species
According to Kew:
Romanschulzia alpina 
Romanschulzia apetala 
Romanschulzia arabiformis 
Romanschulzia correllii 
Romanschulzia costaricensis 
Romanschulzia elata 
Romanschulzia guatemalensis 
Romanschulzia guerrerensis 
Romanschulzia mexicana 
Romanschulzia meyeri 
Romanschulzia orizabae 
Romanschulzia rzedowskii 
Romanschulzia schistacea 
Romanschulzia subclavata

References

Brassicaceae
Brassicaceae genera
Plants described in 1933
Flora of Mexico
Flora of Costa Rica
Flora of Guatemala
Flora of Panama